Commemorative coins were released in the USSR between 1965 and 1991. Most of them were made of copper-nickel alloy, but there were also silver coins, gold coins, palladium coins and platinum coins. All of the coins were minted either by the Moscow Mint (Московский монетный двор, ММД) or by the Leningrad Mint (Ленинградский монетный двор, ЛМД). Certain parts of the mintage of almost each coin were minted using the proof coinage technology.

Coins made of copper-nickel alloy

Silver coins

Gold coins

Platinum coins

Palladium coins

References and sources

Books

Websites

Money of Russia - photos of Soviet commemorative gold, platinum and palladium coins
USSR Silver Coins – with photos and descriptions
The Mint – detailed descriptions and photos of 1965–1996 Soviet and Russian commemorative copper-nickel coins

Coins
Soviet Union